True True Lie is 2009 thriller film directed by Eric Styles. The film follows Dana, who, after 12 years in an asylum, is reunited with her family and longtime friends Nathalie and Paige. Dana slowly begins to realize that the events that led to her stay there may not have been imaginary. True True Lie stars Jaime King as Nathalie, Lydia Leonard as Dana and Annabelle Wallis as Paige.

Cast 
Jaime King as Nathalie 
Lydia Leonard as Dana 
Jason Durr as Dr. Anthony 
Annabelle Wallis as Paige 
Yasmin Paige as Young Dana 
Camille Solari as Lucy 
Tiffany Hannam-Daniels as Young Nathalie 
Diana Gherasim as Young Paige 
Brock Everitt-Elwick as Nicky 
Adam Croasdell as Shaun Rednik 
Elvin Dandel as Martin Van Trier

Reception
Qwipster said of the film, "If you find yourself attracted to sleazy late-night cable thrillers, True True Lie is probably better than most of those, although those with prurient interests will be disappointed that there are only brief flashes of nudity and only some very modest sexual teasing without actual consummation."

References

External links 
 
 

2009 films
2000s thriller films
American thriller films
2000s English-language films
2000s American films